HWP may refer to:

 Half-wave plate, is an optical device that alters the polarization state of a light wave
 Hangul (word processor), a Korean language word processor
 Hardy–Weinberg principle, in population genetics
 Heavy weapons platoon

 Human Waste Project, an American band
 Hutchison Whampoa Property, a property developer in Hong Kong

See also
 Hwp1 (Hyphal Wall protein 1)